Neoxanthin is a carotenoid and xanthophyll.  In plants, it is an intermediate in the biosynthesis of the plant hormone abscisic acid.  It is often present in two forms: all-trans and 9-cis isomers. It is produced from violaxanthin, but a suspected neoxanthin synthase is still to be confirmed. Two different genes were confirmed to be implied in violaxanthin conversion to neoxanthin in Arabidopsis and tomato. It has a specific role in protection against photooxidative stress. It is a major xanthophyll found in green leafy vegetables such as spinach.

References

Carotenoids
Epoxides
Dienes